Wierzbna is a Polish coat of arms. It was used by several szlachta families in the times of the Polish–Lithuanian Commonwealth.

History

Blazon

Notable bearers
Notable bearers of this coat of arms include:
 Jan de Czernina - starosta of Wschowa and Kościan, castellan of Międzyrzecz
 Henryk de Wierzbno - canon of Wrocław

See also
 Polish heraldry
 Heraldry
 Coat of arms

Further reading 
 Andrzej Kulikowski, Wielki herbarz rodów polskich, Warsaw, 2005, ss. 315-316. .

Wierzbna